The Australia men's national under-18 ice hockey team is controlled by Ice Hockey Australia and represents Australia in international under-18 ice hockey competitions. Australia plays in Division IIB of the IIHF World U18 Championships.

History
In 1984 Australia first competed in the inaugural IIHF Asian Oceanic Junior U18 Championships held in Kushiro and Tomakomai, Japan. Australia lost all six of their games being beaten by Japan, China and South Korea. Australia continued to compete in the annual IIHF Asian Oceanic Junior U18 Championships missing only the 1989, 1991, 1995, 1996 and 1997 tournaments. In 2002 Australia competed in the final edition of the Championships which was being discontinued in favour of teams being offered a place in Division III of the IIHF World U18 Championships.

In 2003 Australia competed in their first World Championships. Playing in Division III Group A Australia finished on top of the group and gained promotion to Division II for 2004. The 2004 World Championship saw Australia relegated back to Division III after finishing last in Division II Group B. In the 2005 tournament Australia again gained promotion back to Division II after winning all five of their games.

Australia improved in the 2006 Championship finishing third in their group and staying in Division II for the 2007 tournament. In 2007 Australia finished fifth in their group, avoiding relegating after finishing above Serbia with four points. At the 2008 World Championship Australia lost all five of their games in Division II Group A and were relegated back to Division III. In 2009 Australia won all of its Division III games and gained promotion back to Division II for 2010. However Australia was again relegated back to Division III after finishing last in their group at the 2010 Division II Group B championship in Ukraine.

Players and personnel

Current roster
For the 2019 IIHF World U18 Championship Division II Group B

Current team staff
For the 2019 IIHF World U18 Championship Division II Group B
Head coach: Stephen Laforet
Assistant coach: Brent Laver
General Manager: Paul Kelly
Team Leader: Miranda Ransome
Equipment Manager: Rhett Kelly
Physiotherapist: Evan Adair

International competitions

IIHF Asian Oceanic U18 championships

1984 – 4th place
1985 –  3rd place
1986 – 4th place
1987 – 4th place
1988 – 4th place
1989 – Did not participate
1990 – 4th place
1991 – Did not participate
1992 – 4th place

1993 – 5th place
1994 – 5th place
1995–1997 – Did not participate
1998 – 4th place
1999 – 4th place, failed to qualify for IIHF World U18 Championship Pool B
2000 – 4th place, failed to qualify for IIHF World U18 Championship Division I
2001 –  3rd place, failed to qualify for IIHF World U18 Championship Division III
2002 –  2nd place

IIHF World U18 championships

2000–2002 – Did not qualify
2003 – 35th (1st in Division III Group A. Promoted to Division II)
2004 – 34th (6th in Division II Group B. Relegated to Division III)
2005 – 35th (1st in Division III. Promoted to Division II)
2006 – 28th (3rd in Division II Group B)
2007 – 31st (5th in Division II Group B)
2008 – 33rd (6th in Division II Group A. Relegated to Division III)
2009 – 35th (1st in Division III Group A. Promoted to Division II)
2010 – 34th (6th in Division II Group B. Relegated to Division III)

2011 – 35th (1st in Division III Group A. Promoted to Division II)
2012 – 33rd (5th in Division II Group B)
2013 – 34th (6th in Division II Group B. Relegated to Division III)
2014 – 35th (1st in Division III Group A. Promoted to Division II)
2015 – 34th (6th in Division II Group B. Relegated to Division III)
2016 – 35th (1st in Division III Group A. Promoted to Division II Group B)
2017 – 29th (1st in Division II Group B. Promoted to Division II Group A)
2018 – 28th (6th in Division II Group A. Relegated to Division II Group B)

References

External links
Ice Hockey Australia

National under-18 ice hockey teams
Ice hockey